Strelkovimermis is a genus of nematodes belonging to the family Mermithidae.

Species:
 Strelkovimermis acuticauda Johnson & Kleve, 1996 
 Strelkovimermis amphidis Johnson & Kleve, 2000

References

Mermithidae
Enoplea genera